Events in the Life of Harold Washington is a mural at Chicago's central library, the Harold Washington Library, named after Harold Washington, who was Chicago's first Black mayor.  The mural, painted by Jacob Lawrence, was commissioned in 1991. In an effort to evoke inspiration and empower progressive recollection, Jacob Lawrence's mural, Events in the Life of Harold Washington, not only commemorates Wilson's life, but also highlights and patronizes the African diasporic population's victory against the white power structure of Twentieth Century Chicago while embodying the artist's lifelong examination of the meaning of Black progress and struggle.

Twentieth Century Chicago: A City Divided and the Struggle between Powers 

Contrary to its profound Democratic shift, Twentieth Century Chicago, post-Great Migration, faced a racial divide that bore a white power structure composed of political manipulation as tensions rose within the city.  As an influx of Blacks increased the population of African diasporic peoples in Chicago from 109,000 in 1920 to 1.2 million in years in 1982, white Chicagoans reacted by moving out of their respective homes in the city, especially on the South-Side, towards the suburbs. Here we see the formation of a "Black metropolis" in which Blacks were confined to well-defined black areas and a physical line was drawn between races. Labelled as inferior, Blacks found themselves at the bottom of the economic base where they consequently became subjected to substandard housing, low salary jobs, and no political representation.  However, as the events of the Civil Rights Movement were replaced by the militant Black Panther Party and the Chicago Race Riot of 1919, demands for better conditions incited racial tensions.  White Chicagoans, whether living in racially changing neighbourhoods or at a distance, looked to Chicago's Democratic Party as means to "at least conserve what they had for themselves, while expecting improved schools, housing, and better jobs for their children…[seeing] the civil rights movement as a threat to these aspirations." Here we find the basis for the "white power structure" in 20th Century Chicago.  White Chicagoans knew that "corporate control of the economy [was] managed by and serve[d] the interest of a predominantly white ruling class" and maintained the status quo. As stated by authors Abdul Alkalimat and Doug Gills, "racism operated in the [democratic] party to hold back Blacks from being incorporated equitably with anything approaching democratic representation." In other words, by preventing the Black vote in a physically divided city, the community's education remained substandard, housing conditions worsened, and economic upward mobility was stifled despite promises from politicians.  Looking further, governmental manipulation within the city was seen in the  unjust trials of the Chicago Seven and the FBI murder of Black Panther Party leader Fred Hampton, leading more Blacks to doubt their government and demand more political representation. A struggle emerged from this turmoil in which "a Black political power evoke[d] fear in whites and a political response: the white power backlash." This struggle was for Black representation in a crooked government. However, as this Black power movement to fight the struggle followed an idea of progress, it needed to utilize a symbol of progression.

Harold Washington, a Symbolic Victory, and Chicago’s New "Blackness"

Harold Washington's election as the Chicago's first Black mayor asserted a redefinition of "Blackness" in Chicago.  Up to 1982, Black Chicagoans faced a dilemma in which the "older and higher-income categories were overrepresented among black registrants…[and] voter-registration requirements [had] their greatest effect on poorly educated, low-income, and young voters". In other words, the majority of Blacks in Chicago were not being represented in the voting process in a manner where their influence was felt.  Moreover, when factional struggles existed between the dominant political parties, Blacks would have had an opportunity to capitalize on this competition to satisfy their interests. However, Paul Kleppner notes in his research that the "leaders of [Chicago’s] Machine factions were simply unwilling to risk white ethnic support by representing black racial interests." Thus, when Washington stepped up to run for mayor, he already faced a problem that consisted of low Black voter turnout and a party that did not look to combat Black issues. Fortunately, Washington embodied the necessary characteristics to empower the Black community and "symbolize the mass response to growing systemic inequities" while dispelling a stigma of corrupt politics. 
Having grown up in politics as the son (and successor) of a precinct captain, Washington's familiarity with the Chicago Democratic party politics allowed him give it the most criticism. Most importantly, his lifelong accomplishments allowed him to transcend society's image of "Blackness", enabling him to appear as a serious and well-qualified candidate. These accomplishments did not label him as just the "black" candidate, but instead, the "scholar, athlete, Civilian Conservation Corps worker, soldier, lawyer, [or] U.S. Congressman." Combined with his exceptional oratorical skills and "ability to engage in straight, no-nonsense dialogue with the ‘masses’ and the ‘elites’," Washington would gain the deep support and appreciation from the Black community. Following his election, the numbers showed Washington received overwhelming support among Blacks of all economic classes, affirming a movement for proper representation of a people-independent of their economics statues. With his historic election, he represented a "symbol of black pride and progress," exposing the vulnerability of the institutionalized white power structure.  Artist Jacob Lawrence portrays this milestone in Black Power through his tribute to Harold Washington.

Lawrence’s Mural of Progress

Jacob Lawrence personifies the Black Power movement Events in the Life of Harold Washington, by incorporating themes of past works and his unique, emotionally charged style.  If we look at Figure 1, the picture of the mural in the Harold Washington Public Library illustrates the various accomplishments of Harold Washington, including a celebratory figure at the top of the image.  However, this work of art must be examined by briefly looking at the Lawrence's use of themes.  Lawrence has had a history of depicting historical occurrences in an effort to "examine the [African-Diasporic] struggle for justice, understanding, and a decent life," consistently bringing up a theme of progress and movement. This holds true for his painting pictured in Figure 2, The March (1937), depicting the slave revolt of the Haitian Revolution.  According to his featured 1984 ARTnews article, "he charged that all history can be seen as a succession of mass movements, displacements and upheavals." Thus, when we look at The March, he does not place significance on the fact that these figures are dressed in military attire, but instead on the historical significance of the event that these figures are embodying. Transferring this notion to Figure 1, we can better understand Lawrence's message of empowerment through a redefinition of "Blackness" utilizing powerful, yet little-known history. Furthermore, Lawrence exaggerates this message through his conscious brush strokes.  Figure 3 shows a panel from Lawrence's The Migration of the Negro where we can clearly see the artist's distinguished art form.  He uses a language in which bold, slashing brush strokes give of the "pent-up energy, rage and despair" seen in the painting. According to ARTnews, it is Lawrence's "repeated jagged shapes; harsh, angular lines; a limited palette; and a slanting perspective that tip the scene toward the viewer." Events in the Life of Harold Washington does not stray away from these artistic characteristics.  He uses a limited palette of blue, yellow and green, and his figures come off as bold and jagged. Most importantly, the mural is set up in such of a way to create an apex where one's eyes gravitate towards the celebratory figure. In a way, these figures come alive alluding to Lawrence's theme of movement and the piece as a whole attempts to evoke an emotion of pride and upward mobility-the qualities Washington symbolized during his lifetime and what his election embodied.

Events in the Life of Harold Washington sits in the one of Chicago's newest public libraries for a reason. Many go to the library in search of knowledge-sometimes history. Jacob Lawrence one of Jacob Lawrence's motive re-create little-known historical images was to inspire his audience to use their history to prove they were not inferior but instead victors in past struggles. Lawrence's mural at the Harold Washington library lives as an inspirational recollection of the Chicago Black Power movement for a change in city government and their ability to finally overcome the adversities of a racially divided city.  Jacob's Lawrence's unique art form and persistent use themes of progress and movement in Events in the Life of Harold Washington do justice to the accomplishments of former Mayor Harold Washington and the symbolic representation of Black Chicago's triumph in the struggle against the white power structure.

References 

Murals in Illinois
Public art in Chicago
Harold Washington